Steven Chad Barnhardt (born January 21, 1976) is a former American football quarterback. Barnhardt was a backup for the South Carolina Gamecocks, before transferring and becoming the first starting quarterback for the South Florida Bulls.

Prior to playing for the Bulls, Barnhardt played a backup role for the South Carolina Gamecocks. Looking for a change and an opportunity to start, Barnhardt returned to his native Florida, and became the Bulls' starting quarterback. His legacy is mainly cemented on being the team's first starting quarterback. Additionally, Barnhardt brought credibility, leadership, and direction to the program. Due to this, he was considered "the perfect quarterback for a program trying to find itself." Playing 2 seasons for the team, Barnhardt threw for 4,138 yards and 27 touchdowns, while leading the Bulls to a 13–9 record when he started.

Barnhardt has also served various coaching tenures. After three seasons as the head coach of Lake Wales High School's football team, Barnhardt had a stint with the Bulls as a grad assistant on offense, and later as the offensive coordinator for Webber International University Warriors.

Outside of football, Barnhardt was a business major. Eventually, Barnhardt started to feel burned out from coaching and became the Vice President Commercial Loan Officer at CenterState Bank of Florida, N.A.

References

1976 births
American football quarterbacks
Living people
South Carolina Gamecocks football players
South Florida Bulls football players
Sportspeople from Polk County, Florida